Margarita Formeiro (born 31 October 1944) is an Argentine sprinter. She competed in the women's 100 metres at the 1964 Summer Olympics.

References

1944 births
Living people
Athletes (track and field) at the 1964 Summer Olympics
Argentine female sprinters
Olympic athletes of Argentina
Place of birth missing (living people)
Olympic female sprinters